The Arosæte were an Anglo-Saxon tribe that lived in the Kingdom of Mercia. According to the historian D. P. Kirby  the Arosæte territory, valued at 600 hides by the Tribal Hidage, probably followed the valleys of the two River Arrows, the Worcestershire Arrow which stretches from south Warwickshire to Worcestershire and the Herefordshire Arrow in Herefordshire and Powys.  With the Weorgoran to the southwest, and other tribes to the north and east, their territory may have been close to Droitwich.

References

Peoples of Anglo-Saxon Mercia